The Scott Act was a United States law that prohibited U.S. resident Chinese laborers from returning to the United States. Its main author was William Lawrence Scott of Pennsylvania, and it was signed into law by U.S. President Grover Cleveland on October 1, 1888. It was introduced to expand upon the Chinese Exclusion Act passed in 1882 and left an estimated 20,000-30,000 Chinese outside the United States at the time of its passage stranded, with no option to return to their U.S. residence.

History

Chinese Exclusion 
In the 1850s, Chinese workers migrated to the United States to work in gold mines, take jobs in agriculture and factories, and built railroads in the American West. More than 10,000 workers built the railroad tracks in the American West by hand, 80% of whom were Chinese migrant workers. This influx of Chinese immigrants led to a strong anti-Chinese sentiment among white American workers. In 1880, the Angell Treaty suspended the immigration of Chinese laborers for 10 years and required every Chinese person traveling in or out of the United States to carry a certificate identifying their status as a worker, scholar, diplomat, or merchant. In 1882, Congress passed these terms as the Chinese Exclusion Act. After this, Chinese exclusion was extended for 10 more years with the 1892 Geary Act, then another 10 in 1902. It was made indefinite in 1904.

Bayard-Zhang Treaty

Prior to the Scott Act, the governments of the United States and the Great Qing Empire of China had negotiated the Bayard-Zhang Treaty, whereby the Chinese government would restrict emigration to the United States, and in exchange, the U.S. government would crack down on discrimination and poor treatment against Chinese in the United States. In May 1888, the Senate approved the Bayard-Zhang Treaty, but with amendments that canceled all return certificates of Chinese who were outside of the United States and a 20-year indefinite ban that would continue unless the treaty was renegotiated or renounced. Congress on the whole then passed legislation that enforced the treaty, assuming China would ratify in 1888.

However, the treaty met with considerable opposition, both in China (particularly Kwangtung province) and among the Chinese in the United States, and a delay in ratification on China's part stoked fears that the treaty would be rejected.

Scott Act 
On September 3, 1888, Representative William L. Scott, a Democrat of Pennsylvania, introduced the Scott Act to force the stipulations of the treaty into American law without any agreement from the Chinese government. All Chinese laborers who were residents of the United States were barred from traveling abroad, and those who were abroad –– even those who had certificates allowing their return when the act was passed –– were not allowed to return.

The act read, "Be it enacted by the senate and house of representatives of the United States of America, in congress assembled, that from and after the passage of this act it shall be unlawful for and Chinese laborer who shall at any time heretofore have been . . . a resident within the United States, and who shall have departed, or shall depart, therefrom, and shall not have returned before the passage of this act, to return to or remain the United States."

Scott claimed there were copious amounts of fake Chinese return documents and that the system was being abused, although few actual cases of fraud had been caught. "As the truth is a merchantable commodity from a Chinese point of view, those certificates were in many instances sold to Chinamen who had never been in this country, who took them and came to the United States in violation of the law," Scott said when introducing the act.

In congressional debate regarding the Scott Act, representatives' only other concern was keeping those certificate holders who weren't in the United States from returning. They were concerned Scott's proposed act wouldn't be strict enough to accomplish this, but he assured them it would be. After half an hour of debate, the bill was passed by voice vote. The Senate took up the bill hours after it passed in the House. Senator Henry Teller, Republican of Colorado, said of the act, "There are now about one hundred thousand Chinese who have come into this country, and I myself will welcome any legislation that shall deport every single one of them from the United States and send them back to China, where they belong." The bill passed in the Senate as well.

Due to public pressure, the Chinese government chose not to ratify the treaty, and President Grover Cleveland signed the Scott Act into law on October 1, 1888. In an accompanying message he sent to Congress along with the law, he justified the act by saying China had promised in the renounced Bayard-Zhang treaty to prevent workers from coming to the United States. In absence of this act, Cleveland said, the United States had to act, "An emergency has arisen, in which the Government of the United States is called upon to act in self-defense by the exercise of its legislative power. I cannot but regard the expressed demand on the part of China for a reexamination and renewed discussion of the topics so completely covered by mutual treaty stipulations, as an indefinite postponement and practical abandonment on the objects we have in view..." He recommended that separate legislation should be introduced to allow reentry of the Chinese who were already in transit back to the United States, but this never happened. He also recommended that the United States pay $276,619.75 for injuries to the Chinese in America from violence, which had been a provision of the renounced Bayard-Zhang Treaty, which also never happened.

Supreme Court challenge and upholding

On October 8, 1888, Chae Chan Ping, a Chinese citizen and unskilled laborer working in San Francisco, returned to the US after a trip home to China. He was stopped at the port and denied entry. He challenged the denial and the case reached the Supreme Court. This case, Chae Chan Ping v. United States, was decided on May 13, 1889, in favor of the United States. The Supreme Court said its hands were tied because Congress’ power to exclude aliens was absolute because it was a sovereign power granted by the constitution that could be exercised at any time, “when, in the judgment of the government, the interests of the country require it, cannot be granted away or restrained on behalf of any one.”

While exclusion power did not exist as a federal power at the time of the United States' founding, it became grounded in inherent sovereignty and was unrestrained by the constitution. The Supreme Court decision was an important precedent both for establishing the federal government's discretionary power over immigration and upholding the government's authority to pass and enforce legislation contradictory to the terms of past international treaties (the treaty in question being the Burlingame Treaty of 1868).

See also
 Chinatown, Denver
 Chinese Exclusion
 Chinese American history
 List of United States Immigration Acts
 Chae Chan Ping v. United States
 United States v. Wong Kim Ark, which held that the Chinese Exclusion Act could not overrule the citizenship of those born in the U.S. to Chinese parents

References

Sources

External links
 
 
 

Anti-Chinese legislation
Chinese-American history
United States federal immigration and nationality legislation
Anti-Chinese sentiment in the United States